Jin Na (born 1 April 1976) is a former synchronized swimmer from China. Jin competed in the women's team event at both the 1996 and 2000 Summer Olympics, finishing in seventh place on both occasions. After retiring from the pool, she became the senior team coach for the Chinese national team from 2004 to 2012. Jin now works as a coach for the Waterloo Regional Synchronized Swimming Club in Canada.

References

External links
 Waterloo Regional Synchronized Swimming Club

1976 births
Living people
Chinese synchronized swimmers
Olympic synchronized swimmers of China
Synchronized swimmers at the 1996 Summer Olympics
Synchronized swimmers at the 2000 Summer Olympics
Synchronized swimmers from Jiangsu

Nanjing Sport Institute alumni